Dinosaur Baby Holy Heroes (lit. "Warriors of the Dragon God Baby Dinosaur") is a 2009 Chinese animated anime-influenced television series produced by Beijing Kirin Animation. The series aired on the China Central Television network and other TV networks in China for 52 episodes. The series continued until 2011, lasting for three seasons.

Plot
Long Xiang is a 13-year-old boy who likes dinosaurs very much. One day he wore a bracelet in his grandpa’s Box. A singular phenomenon occurred. He was taken to Hai Long Wan of pangea and just in time to save …Long Xiang learned that he could return to the earth with the power of dragon god and calling a dragon god needed to find four dragon crystal. So he start his adventure of looking for dragon crystal in the pangea.

During the journey, Long Xiang met three companions, Feng Ling, A Guo and Yu. All of the three companions were seeking dragon crystals. But their purposes are different. Feng Ling wanted to get money through seizing baby dinosaurs. A Guo wanted to realize his grandpa’ wish and Yu wanted to obtain mighty force. Each of them had one baby dinosaur and can evolve to get greater combat power.

At first, Feng Ling often wanted to cheat Long Xiang of Bao Bao. He changed his mind after got along with Long Xiang for some time and find dragon crystal wholeheartedly. A Guo was once Pirate Boss and dissolute the Pirate gang and join them after he knew that Long Xiang was finding dragon crystals. Long Xiang and the other two met difficulties in the process of an adventure. Yu appeared at this time and save them all. Yu also joined them after some conversation.

When they found the first dragon crystal in the Lu Bu La regional, they met Hai Li Ba who is a tyrant. Hai Li Ba had a Ji Bei dragon who can issue petrochemical rays. He built the dam to disconnect the resource of water of the village that was below the dam and made the villagers tribute goods with the threat that he would release the hydrops to break the village. He also force miner uncle Da to surrender the location of ancestral treasure house. When he inquire that Long Xiang and the other ones are looking for the dragon crystals following the map, obtaining the dragon crystals became his burning desire. Long Xiang and his companions overcame Hai Liba at last and helped the villagers destroy the dam and protect Xi Meng’s treasure house and get the first dragon crystal from the treasure house.

Across the Lu Bula regional, Long Xiang and his companions entered into enchanted forest. The main energy hub of enchanted forest is the eudemon of tree of thousands of years, who had been controlled by Lily now. The eudemon of tree of thousands of years has no power to sustain the life force of the whole enchanted forest. So the green place turned into desolation and the local water became dead lake in this forest. There were variational creatures everywhere or residents whose minds have been affected. The reason why Lily controlled tree eudemon was that she wanted to get dragon crystals. She also imprisoned her own and Yu’ teacher Xian Yi and wanted to obtain skills to make Su Long evolve ultimately. Her ultimate purpose was to make herself more powerful. Long Xiang and his companions defeated Lily and restored tree eudemon’s life and power and found the dragon crystal protected by eudemon of tree of thousands of years.

After got the dragon crystal protected by eudemon, they came to Xi Ya country. The old king was critically ill and wanted to find the princess had been separated for many years. It was said that the princess has the ability to make plants grow just like her mother. The story opens following the cue. Coincidentally, Feng Ling was just the missing princess. More coincidentally, there was a dragon crystal for which Long Xiang and his companions were looking on the king’s scepter.

But things were not that easy. The Guo Shi of Xi Ya country had early forethought and wanted to seize the throne. He detained the queen to find the princess by one conspiracy after another. After the king’s loyal woman general met Feng Ling, she protected her long-missing princess fight to death. After the probes of Guo Shi knew the things about dragon crystals, they rounded up Feng Ling and her companions with all their strength and wanted to get the three dragon crystals and find the fourth one with their map. At that time, they would own the power of god of dragon and can conquer the whole continent.

It is up to Long Xiang and his friends to save and protect the continent.

Cast

Sun Chang - Long Xiang
Li Min-hyun - Feng Ling
Xia Lei - Yu
Luo Yanqian- Guo

Criticism

Anime fans outside of China have criticized the series for plagiarizing four anime series which are Pokémon, Digimon, Naruto and Dinosaur King. Chinese Central Television (or CCTV) under the direct control of the Chinese Communist Party’s Central Propaganda Department recently began airing Dinosaur Baby Holy Heroes, but fans of anime soon spotted the fact that the series was copying character designs, story and music from the three anime series. An example would be the characters in the series. One character would be A Guo who looks like Sasuke Uchiha from the Naruto series only A Yu who has blue hair with the same hair style that Sasuke Uchiha has. Another example would be the four baby dinosaurs in the series. One more example is the device all four of the children wear is copied from the Digivice all the children wear in the Digimon series. The clowns in the series copied the idea of Team Rocket appearances in Pokémon. Most of the concepts and its aspects have some similarities to Dinosaur King. Because of the release of the series, the government of China has decided to remove from Chinese television all cartoon series that are not from China. They are forbidden because the Chinese animators used elements from Japanese manga.

Titles in other languages

See also
Chinese animation
List of Chinese animated series

External links
Description of the Dinosaur Baby Holy Heroes series

2009 Chinese television series debuts
2000s animated television series
Chinese children's animated adventure television series
Works involved in plagiarism controversies